Eggs is a 1995 Norwegian comedy film by Bent Hamer. It was awarded the 1995 Amanda for Best Norwegian film. It was also entered into the 19th Moscow International Film Festival.

Plot
Two old brothers, Moe and Pa, have lived together for their whole life and are content with their daily and weekly routine. This is disturbed later by the arrival of Pa's grown-up and disabled son Konrad, whose existence (due to a two-day trip of Pa to Småland, the only time Pa and Moe were separated) was unknown to Moe. The weirdness of Konrad and the jealousy of Moe and Konrad then disturb the routine, and Moe leaves home in the end.

Cast
 Sverre Hansen as Moe
 Kjell Stormoen as Pa
 Leif Andrée as Konrad
 Juni Dahr as Cylindia Volund
 Ulf Wengård as Vernon
 Trond Høvik as Blomdal
 Alf Conrad Olsen as Jim
 Leif Malmberg as Priest

References

External links

1995 films
1995 comedy films
Films directed by Bent Hamer
1990s Norwegian-language films
Norwegian comedy films